Albertin Montoya (born February 19, 1975) is a Cuban-born American soccer coach and former player who played as a midfielder. He was the interim head coach of the Washington Spirit late in the National Women's Soccer League 2022 season.

As a player, Montoya spent two seasons with the San Jose Earthquakes. In 1995, Montoya played for the San Francisco United All Blacks in the USISL Premier League.

As a coach, Montoya coached the United States women's national under-17 soccer team from 2011 to 2012.

Montoya is married to Erin Martinez, a former player in the Women's United Soccer Association and alumnus of Santa Clara University.

References

External links

FC Gold Pride coaching profile
Stanford coaching profile
Santa Clara coaching profile

1975 births
Living people
Sportspeople from Camagüey
American soccer coaches
American soccer players
Cuban football managers
Cuban footballers
Cuban emigrants to the United States
American sportspeople of Cuban descent
NC State Wolfpack men's soccer players
Parade High School All-Americans (boys' soccer)
Raleigh Flyers players
San Francisco United All Blacks players
San Jose Earthquakes players
Santa Clara Broncos men's soccer players
A-League (1995–2004) players
USL League Two players
Major League Soccer players
United States men's youth international soccer players
San Jose Earthquakes draft picks
Soccer players from California
Association football midfielders
Women's Professional Soccer coaches